Propebela cassis is a species of sea snail, a marine gastropod mollusk in the family Mangeliidae.

Description
The length of the shell attains 10.5 mm.

Distribution
This species occurs in the Okhotsk Sea.

References

 Bogdanov, IP. "7 New Species of Subfamily Oenopotinae from the Okhotsk Sea." Zoologichesky Zhurnal 68.11 (1989): 147–152.

External links
 

cassis
Gastropods described in 1989